A role-playing game theory is the ludology of role-playing games (RPGs); a study of the topic as a social or artistic phenomenon. RPG theories seek to understand what role-playing games are, how they function, and how the gaming process can be refined in order to improve the experience and produce more useful game products.

About
Role playing games are games in which players assume the role of characters in a fictional setting. Role playing games come in various types and categories:

 Traditional table top RPGs (TFRPG)  TFRPGs have their historical basis in miniature war gaming, with a standard example being Warhammer 40,000. The game advances by rolling a dice, using rulers, tokens or executing other similar actions.
 Collectible Strategy Game (CSG)  CSG has a much broader context than that of a TFRPG due to the fact that it draws elements from both types of RPGs. A CSG is defined as "a setting and a system, but the setting resides in the background, while the system is integrally tied to some of the collectible material artifacts". These types of games are played using special attributes which are associated with the particular collectible being used. You can place these collectibles in offensive or defensive positions, roll the dice to perform a specific action, etc.. Note that this type of RPG is typically associated with CCG or collectible card games (e.g. Magic: The Gathering).
 Online Video and Computer Games (OVCGs)  OVCGs appeared around the 1970s. They are typically defined as RPGs that "require either a personal computer or gaming console in addition to gaming software, rather than source books, cards, or dice". OVCGs did not reach full maturity until the 1990s, when games played cooperatively via large networked servers were available. Current examples of these games include World of Warcraft (Blizzard), Rift (Trion Worlds), and Star Wars: The Old Republic (BioWare).

History
The first organized critical reflection on role-playing games and academic research on them from their inception in the mid-1970s through the 1980s focused on examining and refuting the early controversies surrounding the hobby at the time. Arguably, the first examination of the field in clinical terms came with the publication of Shared Fantasies: Role Playing Games as Social Worlds by Gary Fine. Gary Gygax, a co-originator of the hobby with Dave Arneson, published two books on his philosophy of role-playing, Role Playing Mastery: Tips, Tactics and Strategies in 1989, and Master of the Game in 1990.

In 1994–95 Inter*Active (later renamed Interactive Fiction) published a magazine devoted to the study of RPGs.  In the first issue Robin Laws called for the creation of a critical theory for role-playing games.  By the late 90s discussion on the nature of RPGs on rec.games.frp.advocacy had generated several theories of RPGs which spread to other sites and influenced theorists in France and Scandinavia.  The Scandinavian RPG scene saw several opposing ideological camps about the nature and function of RPGs emerge, and began having regular conventions on live-action role-playing games where RPG theory was featured prominently, called the Knutepunkt. The first Knutepunkt was held in Oslo in 1997 and the annual convention is still being organized today.

In the 21st century, self-defined "Indie role-playing" communities such as the Forge grew on the internet, studying role-playing and developing the GNS Theory of role-playing games. Knutepunkt has continued to grow and an annual collection of articles on role-playing has been published since 2003. Many games, especially those from indie writers, are now written with a conscious awareness and incorporation of RPG theory.

Notable examples
Some RPG theories include:

 Threefold Model  Developed at rec.games.frp.advocacy from 1997 to 1998; proposed by Mary Kuhner, and FAQed by John Kim. It hypothesizes that any GM decision will be made for the purpose of game, drama, or simulation. Thus, player preferences, GMing styles, and even RPG rulesets can be characterised as Game-oriented, Drama-oriented or Simulation-oriented, or more usually as somewhere between the three extremes. This is sometimes called GDS theory. Strictly, GDS theory is concerned with players' social interactions, but it has been extrapolated to direct game design, both in and out of the world of RPGs.  A game can be classified according to how strongly it encourages or facilitates players reinforcing behaviors matching each category.  Game designers find it useful because it can be used to explain why players play certain games.

 GEN Theory  Developed at Gaming Outpost in 2001 largely by Scarlet Jester. It hypothesizes a top and bottom "tier" of play, with the top tier being dominated by "Intent" which is divided into Gamist, Explorative, and Narrative.  It was influenced by threefold and GNS theory.

 The Big Model or Forge Theory  Developed at The Forge from 1999-2005 largely by Ron Edwards – It hypothesizes that roleplaying games are modeled by "The Big Model" with 4 levels: the social contract, exploration, techniques, and ephemera, with creative agendas governing the link from social contract to technique.  In this theory there are 3 kinds of creative agenda, Gamist, Narrativist, and Simulationist agendas. It is detailed in the articles "GNS and Other Matter of Role Play Theory," "System Does Matter," "Narrativism: Story Now" "Gamism: Step on Up" and "Simulationism: The Right to Dream" by Ron Edwards, at the Forge's article page.  The Big Model grew out of GNS Theory, a variant of the Threefold Model.

 Color Theory  Developed by Fabien Ninoles in 2002, was developed on the French createurs-jdr mailing list.  It is an inheritor of SCARF theory and SCAR theory, which then interacted with English language theories.  In this theory the goals of system design are thought of as the primary colors of TV light - Green for simplicity, Blue for realism, Red for consistency, with notions like adaptability, tenacity, brightness, and visibility being extensions of the metaphor.

 Channel Theory  Developed by Larry Hols in 2003; hypothesizes that game play is made up of "channels" of various kinds such as "narration," "moral tone" or "fidelity to setting."  It developed in part as a criticism of the three style theories.

 Wunderkammer-Gesamtkunstwerk (Wu-Ge) Model  Proposed by Lars Konzack of University of Copenhagen as a framework for analysis and design of RPGs, this model examines a role-playing game both as a composite whole (Gesamtkunstwerk) of four art forms: Sub-Creation (setting), Ludus (game system), Performance, and Narrative; and as a "cabinet of curiosities" (Wunderkammer), a metaphor for their capacity to smoothly incorporate any player-suggested concepts into their imaginary space.

 The Turku School  Developed in Turku, Finland, especially by Mike Pohjola from 1999 to the present. It advocates immersion ("eläytyminen") as the primary method of role-playing (especially live action role-playing), and artistic exploration as the primary goal. The Immersionist style is thought to be distinct from dramatist, gamist, and simulationist styles, and dramatism and gamism are thought to be clearly inferior styles of role-play, fit only for other mediums besides roleplaying.

 The Meilahti School  Developed in Helsinki, Finland, by Jaakko Stenros and Henri Hakkarainen from 2002 to the present. It defines role-playing in a way that encompasses many different forms, and shuns normative choices about what the right or best forms are. "A role-playing game is what is created in the interaction between players or between player(s) and gamemaster(s) within a specified diegetic framework."

References

Further reading
<div style="font-size:92%">

Petter Bøckman & Ragnhild Hutchison (eds.): Dissecting Larp. Knutepunkt 2005.  (print)  (online) http://knutepunkt.laiv.org/
Markus Montola & Jaakko Stenros (eds.): Beyond Role and Play. Solmukohta 2004. . https://web.archive.org/web/20060615144314/http://www.ropecon.fi/brap/
Morten Gade, Line Thorup & Mikkel Sander (eds.): As Larp Grows Up. Knudepunkt 2003. . https://web.archive.org/web/20060718051716/http://www.laivforum.dk/kp03_book/
 Mackay, Daniel. The Fantasy Role-Playing Game: A New Performing Art McFarland, 2001.
 Fine, Gary Alan Shared Fantasy: Role Playing Games as Social Worlds University of Chicago Press, 1984
 
 A Brief History of Fashion in RPG Design by John Kim
 An articles compendium about role-playing games theories by John Kim
 Markus Montola and Jaakko Stenros (eds.) Playground Worlds, Solmukohta 2008.  (pdf ) "Key Concepts in Forge Theory" by Emily Care Boss.
Williams, P., Hendricks, S., & Winkler, K. (2006). Essays on reality, identity and experience in fantasy games 
 

Theory
Role-playing games
Game studies